College of the Desert (COD) is a public community college in Palm Desert, California. COD enrolls about 12,500 students, of which around one third attend college full-time. It serves the Coachella Valley of Riverside County. The college is federally recognized as a Hispanic-serving institution (HSI), receiving Title V grants.

COD is the home of the Energy Technology Training Center. COD offers associate degrees and certificate programs.

History

College of the Desert was established in 1958 after a decade of planning for a junior college district in the Coachella Valley. Voters approved the formation of the district and funded the building of the COD campus with a bond issue. On September 21, 1962, the new college opened on its  site in Palm Desert, and in 1966 it gained accreditation.

The Jeane and Justin Hilb student center and the Carol L. Meier Lecture Hall opened in 1998, and Bob and his wife "Mike" Pollock funded the creation of the COD campus's Theatre One in 1999. The Marks Center for the Arts was built from the generosity of Don and Peggy Cravens, Bob and Barbara Leberman, and the COD Alumni Association in 2003. Their substantial support has permitted COD to further upgrade and expand its arts facilities into 2006 and beyond. College of the Desert's library building, opened in 1996, is unique in California as the only one that is shared by a college with both a city (Palm Desert) and a county (Riverside) library.

From 1966 to 1999, residents in the High Desert to the north of the Coachella Valley were also part of the community college district. Their affiliated Copper Mountain Campus in Twentynine Palms was opened in 1984 and remained with the district until 1999, when it was renamed Copper Mountain College and became an independent district.

In 2001, the Eastern Valley Center opened to address a need for more English and ethnic studies classes, such as Mexican American Culture and Intro to African American Literature, as well as for a campus located in the eastern Coachella Valley's agricultural and casino gaming corridor. More than 1,400 students are enrolled in the Eastern Valley Center located in Indio.

Athletics

College of the Desert is a member of the Inland Empire Athletic Conference (IEAC) for 9 of its 15 sports. The Roadrunners programs, such as: Men's Golf, Beach Volleyball, Women's Golf and Women's Tennis, are hosted out to other Southern California Athletic Conferences due to less than 4 IEAC member schools with that sport offering. COD Football is a member of the American Division-Mountain Conference in the Southern California Football Association (SCFA). Each sport has a different competitive alignment within the conference.

COD competes with: Antelope Valley College, (Football Only), Barstow College, Cerro Coso Community College, Chaffey College, Citrus College (Football Only), Copper Mountain College, Crafton Hills College, Mt. San Jacinto College, Norco College, Palo Verde College, San Bernardino Valley College and Victor Valley College.

Because the sport of Football is in its own autonomous Athletic Conference, the Southern California Football Association, COD competes against these schools in the American Division - Mountain Conference: Antelope Valley College, Citrus College, Mt. San Jacinto College, San Bernardino Valley College and Victor Valley College. 

Women's Basketball, Men's Basketball and Women's Volleyball play their home games in the COD Gymnasium at the Bragdon & Inez Garrow Athletic Quad. The Gym was built in 2014. Prior to 2014, COD competed in the Harold & Hazel Wright Gymnasium, which has since been demolished, and in its footprint was placed 8 competition tennis courts.

Football plays their home games at Robert F. Boone Field, named in honor of a COD benefactor. Boone started a mechanical equipment company, B.B. Supply, at the age of 39, in Los Angeles. He later changed the name to Chain Drives Inc. He was a member of the college's President Circle, where he donated $100,000 to the College of the Desert Foundation for the naming rights to the field and the presentation was made at the Homecoming game on November 3, 1984, when the team faced Imperial Valley College. The Roadrunners won the game, 50–8.

Baseball plays their games at Ted Hamilton Field, named in honor of a former Kansas City Royals scout who lived in Indian Wells, California and was a supporter of Roadrunners Baseball. After working 30 years in the motion picture studio business, Hamilton retired to Indian Wells and was appointed as a Planning Commissioner, running for City Council in 1984 and finishing last in the At-Large race. Hamilton was the author of a book, titled "Diamond Dust Tid-Bits," published in 1982 about his years in professional baseball.

Football Trophy Games

The Roadrunners have two Football "Trophy Games" a season, the longest running of which is "The Palms-to-Pines" game, which occurs each season against the Mt. San Jacinto College Eagles. The trophy was sponsored by The Desert Sun beginning in 1970, but that sponsorship has been discontinued for some time. "The Palms-to-Pines" game has taken place every year since the Eagles added an Athletics program, which was 1967. As of the conclusion of the 2017 season, the teams have a 24-25-2 overall record against each other, with Desert holding a 12–14 record at home. The Roadrunners suffered forfeit losses in 1967 and 1970 and are reflected in the overall record.

The other trophy game is the "COD-SBVC Challenge Trophy" game, which has occurred off-and-on since 1981, with San Bernardino Valley College holding a slight edge in the overall record, 18–15. The Roadrunners last won the "Challenge Trophy" in 2015 and has a home record 8–8.

Teddy Roberts Memorial Trophy

From 1976 to 1986, the Teddy Roberts Memorial Trophy was awarded to the Men's Track & Field team MVP

Athletic championships

College of the Desert has numerous accomplishments in the field of competitive sports. Below will soon include a listing of those athletic achievements only bestowed on a select few.

National champions

State champions

Conference champions

Wright Gymnasium

In 1964, voters in the Coachella Valley approved a new $2 million bond issue to complete the first phase of COD construction. Within three years, construction was completed on the gymnasium and several other buildings on campus. The architects selected for the gymnasium and related areas were Williams and Williams, a Palm Springs firm.

On April 1, 1981, a resolution was presented to the Board of Trustees by Mrs. Hazel C. Wright, widow of Harold D. Wright, who graciously offered to the Coachella Valley Community College District (as it was known at that time) and College of the Desert a gift of $100,000. The gift was to be used exclusively for refurbishing the interior and exterior of the gymnasium which would henceforth be known as Wright Gymnasium with appropriate plaque and signage.

Over the years, Wright Gymnasium hosted many notable activities.  Not only did students utilize the facility for their classes, athletic events, and dances, but well-known performers such as Billy Idol, Seals and Crofts, Frank Sinatra, and Johnny Cash performed concerts there. The Los Angeles Lakers and Los Angeles Clippers professional basketball teams held training camps in Wright Gymnasium.

A new upgraded facility was under construction while Wright Gymnasium was razed in 2014. Now in its place are new tennis courts.

Notable alumni
 Eduardo Garcia represents the 56th Assembly District.
 Victor Rojas: Television analyst for the Los Angeles Angels – played baseball for the Roadrunners in the late 1980s
 Gar Forman: General Manager of the Chicago Bulls – COD Roadrunners Men's Basketball assistant (1982–83) and then head coach (1983–85)
 Mike Leach: head football coach at the Mississippi State University - was the linebackers coach for the 1988 season at COD. He went on to become the head coach at Texas Tech from 2000 to 2009, at Washington State from 2012 to 2020 and then at Mississippi State with the Bulldogs from 2020 until his death in 2022. 
 Bruce Blakeman attended COD in 1978 and has had a career in National and State politics and is a frequent political commentator on television and internet outlets. 
 Bryan Robinson: Pro-Football Player - a 14-year NFL veteran, Robinson spent six seasons with the Chicago Bears from 1998 to 2003. He also played for the St. Louis Rams, Miami Dolphins, Cincinnati Bengals and Arizona Cardinals, last playing in 2010. Robinson appeared in 207 career games and was an anchor on the defensive line for the 2001 NFC Central champion Bears. He started at Nose Tackle for the Arizona Cardinals in Super Bowl XLIII.
 Brent Geiberger: professional golfer – PGA Tour (1993–2009)
 Reggie Brown:  football fullback for the Seattle Seahawks.
 Don Burson: was the Roadrunners first football coach (1962-1964). In 1949, he was the starting quarterback for the Rose Bowl champion Northwestern Wildcats. He was drafted as the 365th pick in the 28th round of the 1950 NFL Draft by the Philadelphia Eagles.
 Ken Swearingen: is one of the winningest football coaches in California Community College Athletic Association history. Swearingen came out of retirement to coach at COD in 2004 and 2005, after moving to Indio from Idaho. He led the Roadrunners to the U.S. Bank Beach Bowl in 2004 against Moorpark College.
 Raul Rodriguez: the Vice President/General Manager of KDTV-DT San Francisco/Bay Area Univision - played baseball at COD in the 1990 & 1991 seasons. 
 Jack Renner: professional golfer – played on the PGA Tour from 1977–1988, and on the Champions Tour from 2006–2007. He won the U.S. Junior Amateur Golf Championship in 1973.
 Oh Sangyun: is a Korean actor. He is known for his role as "광기영주" in the ImjinWar1592.
Craig Harmon: professional golfer – brother of famed golf coach Butch Harmon. Craig earned the two highest honors that can be bestowed in his profession. In 2004, Craig was named PGA of America Golf Professional of the Year and in 2005, he was part of the 122-person inaugural class inducted into the PGA of America Hall of Fame. Craig attended COD, transferring to San Jose State University before joining the staff at the famous Lakeside Golf Club in Toluca Lake from 1969 to 1971. He spent a winter at Thunderbird Country Club in Rancho Mirage.
 Warren Pineo: professional golfer – PGA Assistant Golf Professional at Toscana. Prior to joining the team at Toscana Country Club in Indian Wells, Pineo was an assistant golf professional at Indian Ridge Country Club in Palm Desert as well as a professional golfer on the Canadian Tour for two seasons. He has qualified for the Nationwide and PGA Tour events, including the 2007 U.S. Open at Oakmont Country Club.
 John Wilson: professional golfer – played on the Nationwide Tour in 1992 and from 1998 to 2001, winning the 1998 Nike Louisiana Open and the 1999 Nike Dayton Open. He played on the PGA Tour in 1991 and from 1994 to 1997.

References

External links
 Official website

California Community Colleges
Palm Desert, California
Universities and colleges in Riverside County, California
Educational institutions established in 1958
1958 establishments in California
Schools accredited by the Western Association of Schools and Colleges